The St. Mary's Cathedral, also called Garrison Church, is a Roman Catholic cathedral church located in Jammu, Jammu and Kashmir, India. The cathedral is the mother church of the Diocese of Jammu-Srinagar.

It was founded in 1986 by Bishop Hippolytus Anthony Kunnunkal, following with the diocese's elevation by Pope John Paul II's apostolic constitution Qui Sanctissimi Numinis.

History

Pope John Paul II 1986 apostolic constitution, Qui Sanctissimi Numinis, established the Diocese of Jammu-Srinigar from the Apostolic Prefecture of Kafiristan and Kashmir in response to the church's noticeable expansion and growth in the region. The seat of this new diocese was transferred to St. Mary's Cathedral from the seat of the Prefecture, Holy Family Catholic Church, in the same year under the guidance of the first diocese's first bishop, Hippolytus.

The cathedral parish also includes three sites beyond St. Mary's Cathedral: St. Thomas Church, St. Joseph's Church, and St. John Mary Vianney.

See also
Roman Catholicism in India
List of cathedrals in India

References

Roman Catholic cathedrals in India
Buildings and structures in Jammu (city)
Roman Catholic churches in Jammu and Kashmir